was a Japanese novelist.

A native of Osaka, Yamasaki worked as a journalist for the Mainichi Shimbun from 1945 to 1959 after graduating from Kyoto Women's University in Japanese literature. She published her first story, Noren (1957), a story of a kelp trader, based on the experiences of her family's business. The following year, she won the Naoki Prize for her second novel Hana Noren, the story about the founder of an entertainment group. A major influence on her writings of that period was Yasushi Inoue, who was deputy head of the Mainichi Shimbun's cultural news desk.

Yamasaki wrote some stories based on actual events. For example, Futatsu no Sokoku is derived from the biography of a Japanese American David Akira Itami, and Shizumanu Taiyō is based on the Japan Airlines Flight 123 accident.
Several works of hers were featured in films and television dramas.

Main works

References 

 
NHK obituary

External links

1924 births
2013 deaths
Writers from Osaka
20th-century Japanese novelists
21st-century Japanese novelists
Naoki Prize winners